= St. Stephen's Orthodox Church, Visakhapatnam =

Indian Orthodox church in India

St. Stephen's Orthodox Church is a part of the Indian Orthodox Church founded by Saint Thomas, one of the disciples of Jesus Christ, in AD 52 at Malabar, a coastal area in India. In 1959, a few Oriental Orthodox Church believers migrated from the state of Kerala and started the Orthodox style church. The church grew since then, and has now around 150 families as members.

The church celebrated its Golden Jubilee on 24 September 2009. Its vicar is Fr. Cyril Varghese Vadakkadath. The church belongs to the Bangalore Diocese whose metropolitan is Abraham Mar Seraphim.
